These are the official results of the women's 3000 metres event at the 1992 Summer Olympics in Barcelona, Spain. There were a total of 34 participating athletes, with three qualifying heats.

Medalists

Records
These were the standing world and Olympic records (in minutes) prior to the 1992 Summer Olympics.

Tetyana Samolenko competes in this event after her marriage under the name Tetyana Dorovskikh.

Final

Qualifying heats

See also
 1990 Women's European Championships 3000 metres (Split)
 1991 Women's World Championships 3000 metres (Tokyo)
 1993 Women's World Championships 3000 metres (Stuttgart)
 1994 Women's European Championships 3000 metres (Helsinki)
 1995 Women's World Championships 5000 metres (Gothenburg)

References

External links
 Official Report
 Results

 
5000 metres at the Olympics
1992 in women's athletics
Women's events at the 1992 Summer Olympics